The Black Horse Pike Regional School District (BHPRSD) is a regional public high school district serving students in ninth through twelfth grades from Bellmawr Borough, Gloucester Township and Runnemede Borough in Camden County, New Jersey, United States. Students from Bellmawr and Runnemede attend Triton Regional High School, while students from Gloucester Township are split across the district's three schools, based on their home address.

As of the 2020–21 school year, the district, comprised of three schools, had an enrollment of 3,577 students and 286.9 classroom teachers (on an FTE basis), for a student–teacher ratio of 12.5:1.

The district is classified by the New Jersey Department of Education as being in District Factor Group "DE", the fifth-highest of eight groupings. District Factor Groups organize districts statewide to allow comparison by common socioeconomic characteristics of the local districts. From lowest socioeconomic status to highest, the categories are A, B, CD, DE, FG, GH, I and J.

In order to graduate, students must pass the New Jersey High School Proficiency Assessment (HSPA), earn a total of 115 credits and pass the following courses: four years of Physical Education, four years of Health, four years of English, one year of World History / Cultures, two years of U.S. History, three years of Math, three years of Science, two years of Visual / Performing / Practical Arts and a year of Career Education. The district's schools offer Advanced Placement courses, Honors, dual credit with area community colleges and cooperative education / work study programs in business and industry. As of Summer 2014, all three schools have a revamped dress code (that bans tank tops and requests that shorts must be mid-thigh at length) and eliminated homeroom.

History
Early discussions for forming a district date back to 1949, when representatives from Bellmawr, Mount Ephraim, Runnemede and Gloucester Township met to discuss projections for enrollment three years down the road. Students from Bellmawr had been attending Haddon Heights High School, those from Runnemede were at Audubon High School and students from Gloucester Township was sending to Haddonfield Memorial High School. By June 1955, both Audubon Park and Mount Ephraim had dropped consideration of joining the regional district. The remaining districts had been told by their host high schools that Bellmawr students could no longer be accepted at Haddon Heights High School or those from Runnemede at Audubon High School, while Gloucester Township had been forced to send ninth graders to Paulsboro High School, as they could not be accommodated at Haddonfield Memorial High School.

Voters approved spending $2.3 million (equivalent to $ million in ) for construction of Triton Regional High School, the district's first facility. The school opened in September 1957 with a total of 980 students.

Ground was broken in June 1966 for construction for Highland Regional High School, the district's second school facility, which would have a capacity of 1,200 students and be built at a cost of $2.7 million (equivalent to $ million in ) on a site . The school opened in 1967, allowing split sessions at Triton High School to end.

With enrollment at the two existing high schools rising from 2,800 in 1990 to almost 3,500 in 2000, the district planned a third facility. With construction underway in February 2000, Timber Creek High School was constructed on a  site at a cost of $41.2 million (equivalent to $ million in ). The school opened in September 2001 with 850 students, with 1,200 students expected the following school year.

Schools
There are three high schools that are part of the district. Students from Gloucester Township attend one of the three schools based on their residence. The schools in the district (with 2020–21 enrollment data from the National Center for Education Statistics) are:
Highland Regional High School - The school is located in Blackwood and serves Gloucester Township (1,188 students)
Ryan C. Varga, Principal
Timber Creek Regional High School - The school is located in Erial and serves Gloucester Township (1,187)
Kelly McKenzie, Principal
Triton Regional High School - The school is located in Runnemede and serves Gloucester Township, as well as Bellmawr and Runnemede (1,103)
Melissa Sheppard, Principal

Administrators
Core members of the district's administration are:
Dr. Brian Repici, Superintendent
Frank Rizzo, Business Administrator / Board Secretary

Board of education
The district's board of education, comprised of nine members, sets policy and oversee the fiscal and educational operation of the district through its administration. As a Type II school district, the board's trustees are elected directly by voters to serve three-year terms of office on a staggered basis, with three seats up for election each year held (since 2012) as part of the November general election. The board appoints a superintendent to oversee the district's day-to-day operations and a business administrator to supervise the business functions of the district. Seats on the board are allocated to the constituent municipalities based on population, with seven seats allocated to Gloucester Township and one each to Bellmawr and Runnemede.

References

Further reading
  - Clipping from Newspapers.com. Text Detail A, Text Detail B, and Text Detail C.

External links
Black Horse Pike Regional School District

School Data for the Black Horse Pike Regional School District, National Center for Education Statistics

Bellmawr, New Jersey
Gloucester Township, New Jersey
New Jersey District Factor Group DE
Runnemede, New Jersey
School districts in Camden County, New Jersey